Antonio Ferrari may refer to:

Antonio Ferrari (motorsport), owner of the EuroInternational motor racing team
Antonio de Ferraris (1444 – 1517), Italian scholar
Antonio Ferrari (actor) in The Tree of Wooden Clogs